Gatorade is an album by saxophonist Willis Jackson which was recorded in August 1971  and first released on the Prestige label.

Track listing 
 "Good Bread Alley" (Willis Jackson) – 7:30
 "Hey Jude" (Lennon/McCartney) – 4:27
 "Ivy" (Meeks/Jackson) – 5:56
 "Pow!" (Willis Jackson) – 6:09
 "Long And Winding Road" (Lennon/McCartney) – 5:08
 "Gatorade" (Willis Jackson) – 7:48

Personnel 
 Willis Jackson – tenor sax
 Carl Wilson – organ 
 Boogaloo Joe Jones – guitar 
 Jerry Porter – drums 
 Buddy Caldwell – conga

References 

Willis Jackson (saxophonist) albums
Prestige Records albums
1982 albums
Albums recorded at Van Gelder Studio
Albums produced by Bob Porter (record producer)